Punta Pezzo Lighthouse is an active lighthouse located in Punta Pezzo, the closest point of Calabria to Sicily.

Description

See also
 List of lighthouses in Italy

References

External links

 Servizio Fari Marina Militare 
 Picture of Punta Pezzo Lighthouse

Lighthouses in Italy
Buildings and structures in Reggio Calabria